Roselle Park is a borough in Union County, in the U.S. state of New Jersey. As of the 2020 United States census, the borough's population was 13,967, an increase of 670 (+5.0%) from the 2010 census count of 13,297, which in turn reflected reflected an increase of 16 (+0.1%) from the 13,281 counted at the 2000 census.

Roselle Park was incorporated as a borough by an act of the New Jersey Legislature on March 22, 1901, from portions of Union Township. Roselle Park's name is derived from the Roselle Land Improvement Company, which was created in 1866 to lay out a community around the Mulford Station on the Central Railroad of New Jersey. The name "Roselle" is said to have been based on the company's founder, John Conklin Rose or from John Pierre Roselle, a friend of the railroad's president.

History
The first known settlement within what is now the Borough was built by Samuel Williams in 1700. Galloping Hill Road was continually used by revolutionary war scouts, delivering messages to and from General George Washington and Governor Livingston. Galloping Hill Road also believed to be the route traveled by the British columns en route to the Battle of Connecticut Farms, battling the New Jersey militia the entire way. Son of American general William Crane, was bayoneted and killed by the British near what is now Galloping Hill Road and Colonial Road.

Elizabethtown & Somerville Railroad passed through in 1839, as the first railroad in Northern New Jersey. The first store in the world to be lit by electric light was Stone's Store on Westfield Avenue, lit by Thomas Edison's carbon filament prototype.

The formation of Roselle Park in 1901 occurred due to a number of grievances based on a lack of sufficient public services, including; lack of a modern sewage system, poor schools, neglected roads, and minimal public safety measures.

In 1907, the first poured concrete building in the world, now the Robert Gordon School, was built in Roselle Park using Edison's revolutionary process. Roselle Park was home to the factory and lab of Marconi Wireless Telegraph, and in late 1921 became the site of WDY, the first radio broadcasting station licensed in the state of New Jersey.

Geography
According to the United States Census Bureau, the borough had a total area of 1.23 square miles (3.17 km2), all of which was land.

Unincorporated communities, localities and place names located partially or completely within the borough include Lorraine.

The borough is bordered to the northeast by Union Township, to the northwest by Kenilworth, to the east by Elizabeth, to the south by Roselle and to the west by Cranford.

Demographics

2010 census

The Census Bureau's 2006–2010 American Community Survey showed that (in 2010 inflation-adjusted dollars) median household income was $61,923 (with a margin of error of +/− $5,415) and the median family income was $75,017 (+/− $8,553). Males had a median income of $50,502 (+/− $5,243) versus $41,193 (+/− $5,261) for females. The per capita income for the borough was $30,566 (+/− $2,011). About 3.6% of families and 5.1% of the population were below the poverty line, including 9.0% of those under age 18 and 1.9% of those age 65 or over.

2000 census
As of the 2000 United States census there were 13,281 people, 5,137 households, and 3,416 families residing in the borough. The population density was 10,855.7 people per square mile (4,203.1/km2). There were 5,258 housing units at an average density of 4,297.8 per square mile (1,664.0/km2). The racial makeup of the borough was 80.87% White, 2.42% African American, 0.11% Native American, 9.14% Asian, 0.02% Pacific Islander, 4.89% from other races, and 2.55% from two or more races. Hispanic or Latino of any race were 16.34% of the population.

There were 5,137 households, out of which 30.1% had children under the age of 18 living with them, 50.8% were married couples living together, 11.2% had a female householder with no husband present, and 33.5% were non-families. 28.2% of all households were made up of individuals, and 8.5% had someone living alone who was 65 years of age or older. The average household size was 2.58 and the average family size was 3.22.

In the borough the population was spread out, with 22.2% under the age of 18, 8.8% from 18 to 24, 33.5% from 25 to 44, 22.8% from 45 to 64, and 12.6% who were 65 years of age or older. The median age was 37 years. For every 100 females, there were 95.0 males. For every 100 females age 18 and over, there were 91.4 males.

The median income for a household in the borough was $53,717, and the median income for a family was $63,403. Males had a median income of $42,623 versus $33,105 for females. The per capita income for the borough was $24,101. About 3.4% of families and 4.3% of the population were below the poverty line, including 6.3% of those under age 18 and 1.6% of those age 65 or over.

Government

Local government

The Borough of Roselle Park is governed under the Borough form of New Jersey municipal government, which is used in 218 municipalities (of the 564) statewide, making it the most common form of government in New Jersey. The governing body is comprised of the Mayor and the Borough Council, with all positions elected on a partisan basis as part of the November general election. The Mayor is elected directly by the voters to a four-year term of office. The Borough Council is comprised of six members elected to serve three-year terms on a staggered basis, with two seats coming up for election each year in a three-year cycle. Roselle Park is divided into five election districts, referred to as wards. One councilperson is elected from each ward, and one councilperson is elected from the borough at-large, with two council seats up for election each year for three-year terms of office. Roselle Park is one of only two boroughs statewide that use wards (the other is Roselle). The borough form of government used by Roselle Park is a "weak mayor / strong council" government in which council members act as the legislative body with the mayor presiding at meetings and voting only in the event of a tie. The mayor can veto ordinances subject to an override by a two-thirds majority vote of the council. The mayor makes committee and liaison assignments for council members, and most appointments are made by the mayor with the advice and consent of the council.

, the mayor of Roselle Park is Democrat Joseph Signorello III, whose term of office ends December 31, 2022. Members of the Borough Council are Council President Joseph Petrosky (Ward 2; D, 2024), Jodi P. Bellomo (Ward 3; R, 2022; elected to serve an unexpired term), Michael Connelly (Ward 4; D, 2022), Gregory Johnson (Ward 1; D, 2023), Jay Robaina (Ward 5; D, 2024) and Joseph Signorello Jr. (At-large; D, 2023).

When former Mayor and newly elected Councilman-At-Large Joe DeIorio was sworn into office in January 2018, serving with his husband Fifth Ward Councilman Thos Shipley, they became the first openly gay married couple to serve elected public office together for the same municipality.

On December 4, 2015, Councilwoman Charlene Storey announced that she would resign from here seat effective January 7, 2016, due to her opposition to the council's decision to rename the annual ceremony from "The Tree Lighting" to "The Christmas Tree Lighting", citing issues of establishment of a preferred religion. However, the next day, Storey and Mayor Hokanson reached an agreement stating that Storey would rescind her resignation and that she would chair a committee on diversity in the borough. In August 2016, Storey became an independent after being removed by the Democratic Committee; In January 2017, Eugene Meola switched his voter registration from Democratic to independent.

In January 2015, Joseph Petrosky was chosen by the borough council from among three candidates offered by the municipal Democratic committee to fill the Second Ward seat vacated by Charlene Storey when she took office to fill the at-large seat.

In the wake of charges that he had stolen campaign signs from a neighbor's lawn, Fifth Ward Michael Yakubov announced in January 2015 that he would be resigning from office in March. Richard Templeton was selected by three candidate nominated by the Republican municipal committee and appointed to Yakubov's vacant seat in March 2015, before switching parties and becoming a Democrat five days after he took office.

On November 3, 2015, Republican Thos Shipley bested incumbent Rich Templeton by 60% of the vote  On January 7, 2016, Thos Shipley made Borough history twice as the first African American and the first openly gay member of the governing body sworn into office. Councilman Shipley is also married to former 16-year Mayor Joseph DeIorio, the longest-serving mayor in Borough history.

Federal, state and county representation
Roselle Park is located in the 10th Congressional District and is part of New Jersey's 21st state legislative district.

 

Union County is governed by a Board of County Commissioners, whose nine members are elected at-large to three-year terms of office on a staggered basis with three seats coming up for election each year, with an appointed County Manager overseeing the day-to-day operations of the county. At an annual reorganization meeting held in the beginning of January, the board selects a Chair and Vice Chair from among its members. , Union County's County Commissioners are 
Chair Rebecca Williams (D, Plainfield, term as commissioner and as chair ends December 31, 2022), 
Vice Chair Christopher Hudak (D, Linden, term as commissioner ends 2023; term as vice chair ends 2022),
James E. Baker Jr. (D, Rahway, 2024),
Angela R. Garretson (D, Hillside, 2023),
Sergio Granados (D, Elizabeth, 2022),
Bette Jane Kowalski (D, Cranford, 2022), 
Lourdes M. Leon (D, Elizabeth, 2023),
Alexander Mirabella (D, Fanwood, 2024) and 
Kimberly Palmieri-Mouded (D, Westfield, 2024).
Constitutional officers elected on a countywide basis are
County Clerk Joanne Rajoppi (D, Union Township, 2025),
Sheriff Peter Corvelli (D, Kenilworth, 2023) and
Surrogate Susan Dinardo (acting).
The County Manager is Edward Oatman.

Politics
As of March 2011, there were a total of 7,525 registered voters in Roselle Park, of which 2,325 (30.9% vs. 41.8% countywide) were registered as Democrats, 1,279 (17.0% vs. 15.3%) were registered as Republicans and 3,918 (52.1% vs. 42.9%) were registered as Unaffiliated. There were 3 voters registered as Libertarians or Greens. Among the borough's 2010 Census population, 56.6% (vs. 53.3% in Union County) were registered to vote, including 72.9% of those ages 18 and over (vs. 70.6% countywide).

In the 2012 presidential election, Democrat Barack Obama received 60.4% of the vote (3,064 cast), ahead of Republican Mitt Romney with 38.1% (1,931 votes), and other candidates with 1.5% (75 votes), among the 5,117 ballots cast by the borough's 7,841 registered voters (47 ballots were spoiled), for a turnout of 65.3%. In the 2012 presidential election, Democrat Barack Obama received 3,064 votes (59.9% vs. 66.0% countywide), ahead of Republican Mitt Romney with 1,931 votes (37.7% vs. 32.3%) and other candidates with 75 votes (1.5% vs. 0.8%), among the 5,117 ballots cast by the borough's 7,841 registered voters, for a turnout of 65.3% (vs. 68.8% in Union County). In the 2008 presidential election, Democrat Barack Obama received 3,083 votes (53.5% vs. 63.1% countywide), ahead of Republican John McCain with 2,530 votes (43.9% vs. 35.2%) and other candidates with 96 votes (1.7% vs. 0.9%), among the 5,759 ballots cast by the borough's 7,953 registered voters, for a turnout of 72.4% (vs. 74.7% in Union County). In the 2004 presidential election, Democrat John Kerry received 2,753 votes (50.6% vs. 58.3% countywide), ahead of Republican George W. Bush with 2,619 votes (48.1% vs. 40.3%) and other candidates with 43 votes (0.8% vs. 0.7%), among the 5,443 ballots cast by the borough's 7,773 registered voters, for a turnout of 70.0% (vs. 72.3% in the whole county).

In the 2013 gubernatorial election, Republican Chris Christie received 56.6% of the vote (1,610 cast), ahead of Democrat Barbara Buono with 41.6% (1,183 votes), and other candidates with 1.8% (50 votes), among the 2,923 ballots cast by the borough's 7,676 registered voters (80 ballots were spoiled), for a turnout of 38.1%. In the 2009 gubernatorial election, Republican Chris Christie received 1,700 votes (49.2% vs. 41.7% countywide), ahead of Democrat Jon Corzine with 1,404 votes (40.6% vs. 50.6%), Independent Chris Daggett with 249 votes (7.2% vs. 5.9%) and other candidates with 41 votes (1.2% vs. 0.8%), among the 3,455 ballots cast by the borough's 7,711 registered voters, yielding a 44.8% turnout (vs. 46.5% in the county).

Education
The Roselle Park School District serves public school students in pre-kindergarten through twelfth grade. As of the 2018–19 school year, the district, comprised of five schools, had an enrollment of 2,034 students and 174.8 classroom teachers (on an FTE basis), for a student–teacher ratio of 11.6:1. Schools in the district (with 2018–19 enrollment data from the National Center for Education Statistics) are 
Aldene Elementary School with 286 students in grades Pre-K–5, 
Robert Gordon Elementary School with 266 students in grades Pre-K–5, 
Sherman Elementary School with 355 students in grades K–5, 
Roselle Park Middle School with 526 students in grades 6–8 and 
Roselle Park High School with 587 students in grades 9–12.

Library
The Roselle Park Veterans Memorial Library was renamed in the early 1980s in honor of the veterans of Roselle Park. The library offers a photocopier and fax service and allows its patrons to reserve and renew materials over the phone and online. The library offers free Wi-Fi access.

The Veterans Memorial Library offers an array of events such as charity projects, book discussions, and a Book of the Month Club. The Veterans Memorial Library also caters to children and young teens with many different events.  Events such as Homework Help, No Bullying Resources, and Crazy For Crafts, among other things, are offered free of charge and children are encouraged to participate.

Parks and recreation

Roselle Park RVRR rail trail

Area residents have proposed a  pedestrian linear park along the main line of the abandoned Rahway Valley Railroad that would run through Roselle Park.  The rail trail would run eastbound from Overlook Medical Center on the edge of downtown Summit and head south through  Springfield,  Union, over Route 22 to Kenilworth and end at the southwest edge of Roselle Park at the Cranford border.  A northern portion of the rail trail on the RVRR main line is under construction as the Summit Park Line, with a footbridge over Morris Avenue installed in October 2022. In parallel, advocates have been pushing for immediate development of the portion of the RVRR Main Line south of Route 22, running past the Galloping Hill Golf Course through Kenilworth and Roselle Park. The New Jersey Department of Transportation, which owns the railbed, has been working to clear it in anticipation of possible future trail use for pedestrians and cyclists.

Transportation

Roads and highways

Route 28 passes through Roselle Park. The Garden State Parkway passes just beyond the western boundary of the borough.

Public transportation
NJ Transit provides service on bus routes 58 route with service from Elizabeth to Kenilworth, 94 to Newark and 113 to the Port Authority Bus Terminal in New York City.

Newark Liberty International Airport is approximately 10 minutes away. Linden Airport, a general aviation facility, is in nearby Linden.

The Roselle Park station offers NJ Transit commuter rail service as part of its Raritan Valley Line service. This was a result of the Aldene Connection that opened in Roselle Park on April 30, 1967, between tracks of the Central Railroad of New Jersey and the Lehigh Valley Railroad, allowing passengers to travel directly to Newark Penn Station and change there for trains to New York Penn Station, rather than riding to Jersey City and taking ferries into Manhattan. In January 2015, New Jersey Transit began Raritan Valley service directly to New York Penn Station through the use of dual-powered diesel and overhead electric ALP-45DP locomotives. Currently the Roselle Park station is located at milepost 16.0 on the Conrail Lehigh Line, on the corner of Chestnut Street and West Lincoln Avenue; the same location as the original Lehigh Valley station. In addition to local travel, one can take the train to Newark or New York and connect to various modes of travel to nearly anywhere in the U.S. and Canada.

Railroad history

Roselle Park has a rich railroading heritage. A steam locomotive adorns the Borough seal, and the town is very welcoming to railroad enthusiasts.

The Elizabethtown & Somerville railway began laying rails through what would become Roselle Park in 1839. It eventually became the Central Railroad of New Jersey between Jersey City, New Jersey, and Scranton, Pennsylvania. Throughout the years as traffic grew, the line would grow to four main tracks, and also offered trains of Reading Company and the Baltimore and Ohio Railroad.

Competition would come as the Lehigh Coal and Navigation Company realized that railroading was a more efficient mode of transportation for their coal than a canal system. They formed the Lehigh Valley Railroad, and began building eastward in 1853. By 1872, they had reached Roselle, and formed the subsidiary Newark and Roselle Railway in order to continue building east to the Hudson River.

Roselle Park and Roselle formerly shared a rail station on the CNJ mainline. Passenger service east of Bayonne ended on April 30, 1967. Shuttle service between Bayonne and Cranford continued on until August 1978 but eventually ended, resulting in the closure of the old station on Chestnut Street. The line continued to see operation as an access route to the NJTransit/NJDOT railroad shops at Elizabethport until the mid-1980s. It is currently in service and used, as the Conrail Shared Assets Elizabeth Industrial Track and serves several local industries.

On April 1, 1976, the Lehigh Valley Railroad became part of the Consolidated Rail Corporation (Conrail) and became known as the "Lehigh Line". On June 1, 1999, Conrail was purchased and split between Norfolk Southern (58%) and CSX (42%), and became "shared assets". Conrail continues to operate the Lehigh Line between Newark and Manville for Norfolk Southern and CSX. In addition to NJ Transit, the line sees anywhere from 35-45 freight trains per day from three railroads; Conrail, Norfolk Southern, and CSX. Canadian Pacific (formerly Delaware and Hudson Railway) utilized trackage rights into Oak Island Yard in Newark until 2012. The track is Norfolk Southern's primary access on their northern transcontinental route into and out of the New York City metropolitan area, and is also part of CSX's primary north–south corridor between New England and Jacksonville, Florida.

The borough was once served by the Rahway Valley Railroad. The line was exempted in 1991 by then Rahway Valley Railroad controller Delaware Otsego Corporation, and was given to the County of Union. It has remained dormant since. However, beginning in 2004, the Union County Board of Chosen Freeholders began taking steps to reactivate the routes. They named the Morristown and Erie Railway as designated operator and funded the beginning of right-of-way renewal, though the project has faced opposition from residents who incorrectly believed that the line would be used to transport trash. All funding for the project was spent on litigation with opponents. Currently the Morristown and Erie Railway is awaiting further funding to complete the work. , the project was halted and no further steps were being taken to reactivate the railway. As of 2022, local residents have been advocating for conversion to a pedestrian rail trail.

Notable people

People who were born in, residents of, or otherwise closely associated with Roselle Park include:

 Michael Ausiello (born 1972), TV Guide writer
 Rick Barry (born 1944), NBA All-Pro forward who was ranked #2 on the Sports Illustrated list of The 50 Greatest New Jersey Sports Figures
 Frank R. Burns (1928–2012), American football player and coach, who was head coach of the Rutgers Scarlet Knights from 1973 to 1982
 Mike Daly, producer / songwriter / multi-instrumentalist
 Gregory Gillespie (1936–2000), artist
 Edmund Kara (1925–2001), fashion illustrator and designer, interior designer, and sculptor on the Big Sur coast of California
 Keith Loneker (1971–2017), former professional football player and actor
 Marisa Acocella Marchetto (born 1962), cartoonist and author of the New York Times best-selling graphic novel Ann Tenna, the graphic memoir Cancer Vixen and Just Who the Hell is She, Anyway?
 James J. Norris (1907–1976), advocate for refugees and migrants who was the first president of the International Catholic Migration Commission
 Alan Pasqua (born 1952), pianist, composer and jazz musician
 Dick Sweeney, businessman and co-founder of Keurig, developer of the K-Cup single coffee brewing system

References

External links

 Borough website

 
1901 establishments in New Jersey
Borough form of New Jersey government
Boroughs in Union County, New Jersey
Populated places established in 1901